"Little Old Wine Drinker Me" (sometimes rendered with a comma between the final two words) is a country pop song written in the 1960s by Hank Mills and Dick Jennings. The title parodied what was then a well-known catchphrase in TV commercials for Italian Swiss Colony wine company: "The little old winemaker, me!". The song is about a man trying to drink away his romantic troubles.

The song was first released by Charlie Walker in 1966, on the album Wine, Woman & Walker. It became a hit when it was released by Robert Mitchum in early 1967, and by Dean Martin later the same year on his album Welcome to My World. Lefty Frizzell also recorded the song on his 1967 album Puttin 'On.

Mitchum's version spent two weeks on the Billboard Hot 100 chart, peaking at No. 96, while reaching No. 9 on Billboards Hot Country Singles chart.

Martin's version spent six weeks on the Billboard Hot 100 chart, peaking at No. 38, while reaching No. 5 on Billboards Easy Listening chart, and No. 4 on Australia's Go-Set chart.

In Canada, Martin's version and Mitchum's version reached No. 32 on the RPM 100, in a tandem ranking.

The Martin recording later became popular with the Scottish football club Clydebank and can often be heard being chanted on the terraces with ‘Tennessee’ being replaced with ‘Kilbowie’ in homage to the club's former ground in the town.

References

1966 songs
1967 singles
Robert Mitchum songs
Dean Martin songs
Monument Records singles
Reprise Records singles
Song recordings produced by Jimmy Bowen
Songs written by Hank Mills